Frank Kaufmann is the director of the Inter Religious Federation for World Peace (IRFWP) (originally a Unification Church ecumenical organization). He served as editor in chief of the IRFWP's academic journal Dialogue and Alliance from 1998 until 2009, during which time, in 2004 was named as one of the top ten religion journals (out of 650) by an independent panel commissioned by the American Theological Library Association (ATLA)

In 2007, Kaufmann was nominated for Hofstra University's first Guru Nanak Interfaith Prize.

In 2011, Kaufmann established Filial Projects as the umbrella corporation for his humanitarian and scholarly efforts.

See also
 Junsei Terasawa
 Nam(u) Myōhō Renge Kyō

References

External links
 The Inter Religious Federation for World Peace
 Mere Light, blog of Kaufmann's "observations, analysis, commentary"

American Unificationists
Year of birth missing (living people)
Living people